Quilta is a genus of grasshoppers in the subfamily Oxyinae. Species can be found in Indo-China.

Species
The Orthoptera Species File lists the following:
 Quilta deschauenseei Rehn, 1957 - Thailand
 Quilta mitrata (Stål, 1861) - type species (as Acridium mitratum Stål) - Vietnam
 Quilta oryzae Uvarov, 1925 - Thailand & Vietnam

References

External links
Image at iNaturalist

Oxyinae
Acrididae genera
Orthoptera of Asia
Invertebrates of Vietnam